, commonly called Tokio Marine Nichido, is a property/casualty insurance subsidiary of Tokio Marine Holdings, the largest non-mutual private insurance group in Japan. Tokio Marine Holdings was formerly known as Millea Group, which underwent a name change in July 2008. Its headquarters are in Marunouchi, Chiyoda, Tokyo.

The company is one of the very few groups and individuals that still use the spelling Tokio for the city in the English language.

History

The Tokio Marine and Fire Insurance
The antecedent Tokyo Marine insurance is the first insurance company (as the marine insurance company) in Japan, and also the top sales damage insurance company of Japan in pre-war era.

 August, 1879 - Tokyo Marine Insurance (東京海上保険) established.
 January, 1891 - Meiji Fire Insurance (明治火災保険) established.
 April, 1918 - Tokyo Marine Insurance changes the trade name to Tokyo Marine and Fire Insurance (東京海上火災保険).
 March, 1919 - Mitsubishi Marine and Fire Insurance (三菱海上火災保険) established.
 March, 1944 - Tokio Marine and Fire Insurance acquires Meiji Fire Insurance and the Mitsubishi Marine and Fire insurance.

The Nichido Fire & Marine Insurance

The company was one of the "Big Three Personal property insurance companies" in pre-war Japan. It belonged to the old Yasuda zaibatsu.

 February, 1898 - Tokyo Article Fire Insurance (東京物品火災保険) established.
 November, 1911 - Toho Fire Insurance (東邦火災保険) established.
 January, 1914 - Tokyo Article Fire Insurance change the trade name to the Japan Personal Property fire insurance (日本動産火災保険).
 August, 1944 - Japan Personal Property fire insurance acquires Toho Fire Insurance.
 December, 1946 - Change of trade name to Nichido Fire & Marine Insurance.

Merger
On 1 November 2004, Tokio Marine & Fire Insurance and Nichido Fire and Marine Insurance merged to create Tokio Marine & Nichido Fire Insurance Co., Ltd.

In 2008 Tokio Marine the president of the company resigned. It was found that the company had fraudulently failed to pay out insurance claims in over 1000 cases, they neglected to pay benefits on another 85,000 insurance products and they overcharged policyholders on premiums, causing a major scandal involving over 7 billion yen ($86,000,000 in today’s money) and leading to penalties for over 170 executives.

Subsidiaries

Japan

Tokio Marine Asset Management Co.
Tokio Marine Capital Co.
Tokio Marine Financial Solutions
Tokio Marine & Nichido Card Service Co.
Tokio Marine & Nichido Medical Service Co.
Tokio Marine Nichido Better Life Service Co.
Tokio Marine Nichido Systems Co.
Tokio Marine & Nichido Communications Co.
Tokio Marine Research Institute
International Assistance Co.
Tokio Marine & Nichido Risk Consulting Co.
Tokio Marine & Nichido Corporation Co.
Japan Real Estate Asset Management Co.

Overseas

People's Republic of China

 Tokio Marine & Fire Insurance Company (Hong Kong)
 Tokio Marine Investment Services Ltd.
 Sino Life Insurance Co.

Singapore

Tokio Marine Malayan Insurance Co., Inc.
The Tokio Marine and Fire Insurance Company (Singapore) Pte. Limited
TM Claims Service Asia Pte. Ltd.
Tokio Marine Retakaful Pte. Ltd.

Thailand

The Sri Muang Insurance Co., Ltd.
Millea Life Insurance (Thailand) Public Co., Ltd.

United Kingdom
Tokio Marine Kiln

United Arab Emirates

Tokio Marine Middle East, Ltd.
Tokio Marine & Nichido Fire Insurance Co. Ltd.

United States

Tokio Marine HCC
Philadelphia Insurance Companies
Tokio Marine Management, Inc.
Tokio Marine Technologies LLC
Trans Pacific Insurance Company
TM Casualty Insurance Company
TM Specialty Insurance Company
TNUS Insurance Company
First Insurance Company of Hawaii, Ltd.
TM Claims Service, Inc.
Tokio Marine North America Services LLC.

Other countries

 Australia: Tokio Marine Management (Australasia) Pty. Ltd.
 Bahrain: The Arab Eastern Insurance Co., Ltd.
 Brazil: Tokio Marine Seguradora S.A.
 Bermuda: Tokio Millennium Re Ltd.
 Egypt: [Tokio Marine Egypt] Nile Takaful
 Guam: Tokio Marine Pacific Insurance Limited
 India: IFFCO Tokio General Insurance Company Limited
 India: Edelweiss Tokio Life Insurance Company Limited
 Indonesia: P.T. Asuransi Tokio Marine Indonesia
 Ireland: Tokio Marine Global Re Limited
 Vietnam: Bao Viet Tokio Marine Joint Venture Company.
 Malaysia: Tokio Marine Insurans (Malaysia) Bhd.
 México: Tokio Marine Compañía de Seguros, S.A. de C.V.
 Republic of China (Taiwan): Tokio Marine Newa Insurance Co., Ltd.
 Kingdom of Saudi Arabia: Alinma Tokio Marine Company
 United Arab Emirates:Tokio Marine Middleeast Limited
 United Arab Emirates:Tokio Marine Nichido Insurance UAE

References

External links

 TokioMarine-Nichido.co.jp

Tokio Marine
Companies formerly listed on the Tokyo Stock Exchange
Insurance companies based in Tokyo
Insurance companies of Hong Kong
Tokio Marine and Nichido Fire Insurance
Financial services companies established in 1879
Marine insurance companies
Japanese companies established in 1879